Eduardo Luiz Saverin (born March 19, 1982) is a Brazilian billionaire entrepreneur and angel investor based in Singapore. Saverin is one of the co-founders of Facebook. In 2012, he owned 53 million Facebook shares (approximately 2% of all outstanding shares), valued at approximately $2 billion at the time. He also invested in early-stage startups such as Qwiki and Jumio.

Early life and education 
Eduardo Luiz Saverin was born in the city of São Paulo to a wealthy Jewish-Brazilian family, and his family later moved to Rio de Janeiro. Saverin's father, Roberto Saverin, was a businessman working in clothing, shipping, energy, and real estate. His mother, Sandra, was a psychologist. He has two siblings. His Romanian-born grandfather, Eugenio Saverin (born Eugen Saverin), is the founder of Tip Top, a chain of children's clothing shops. In 1993, the family immigrated to the U.S., settling in Miami, Florida.

Saverin attended Gulliver Preparatory School in Miami. He then attended Harvard University, where he was a resident of Eliot House, a member of the Phoenix S.K. Club, and president of the Harvard Investment Association. While an undergraduate at Harvard, Saverin used his interest in meteorology to predict hurricane patterns and made $300,000 via investment in oil futures. In 2006, Saverin graduated magna cum laude from Harvard University with a Bachelor of Arts in economics. He is a member of the Alpha Epsilon Pi fraternity (Eta Psi chapter of Harvard University).

Career 
During his junior year at Harvard, Saverin met fellow Harvard undergraduate, sophomore Mark Zuckerberg. Noting the lack of a dedicated social networking website for Harvard students, the two worked together to launch The Facebook in 2004. They each agreed to invest $1,000 in the site. Later, Zuckerberg and Saverin each agreed to invest another $18,000 in the operation. As co-founder, Saverin held the role of chief financial officer and business manager. On May 15, 2012, Business Insider obtained and released an exclusive email from Zuckerberg detailing how he cut Saverin from Facebook and diluted his stake. Zuckerberg privately stated at the time, "Eduardo is refusing to co-operate at all ... We basically now need to sign over our intellectual property to a new company and just take the lawsuit ... I'm just going to cut him out and then settle with him. And he'll get something I'm sure, but he deserves something ... He has to sign stuff for investments and he's lagging and I can't take the lag." Zuckerberg's attorney warned Zuckerberg that the dilution might trigger a lawsuit for breach of fiduciary duty. Facebook filed a lawsuit against Saverin, arguing that the stock-purchase agreement Saverin signed in October 2005 was invalid. Saverin then filed a suit against Zuckerberg, alleging Zuckerberg spent Facebook's money (Saverin's money) on personal expenses over the summer. In 2009, both suits were settled out of court. Terms of the settlement were not disclosed and the company affirmed Saverin's title as co-founder of Facebook. Saverin signed a non-disclosure contract after the settlement.

In 2010, Saverin co-founded Aporta, an online portal for charity. In 2015, Saverin established his venture capital firm, B Capital, investing in Southeast Asia and India. In 2016, Saverin's fund closed initial deals of over $140 million in Asia, including Ninja Van, a Singaporean logistics company that engages in last mile parcel delivery in Southeast Asia.

In addition to forming B Capital, in early 2020, Saverin invested in Antler, an early-stage VC fund and startup accelerator founded by his friend and Harvard classmate, Magnus Grimeland.

In media
Saverin is played by Andrew Garfield in the film The Social Network, which is based on Ben Mezrich's The Accidental Billionaires.

Personal life
Saverin emigrated to Singapore in 2009. Saverin and Elaine Andriejanssen, an Indonesian national of Chinese descent, became engaged on March 27, 2014, and were married on June 25, 2015. They met while they were both studying at their respective universities in the U.S. state of Massachusetts, he at Harvard and she at Tufts. Andriejanssen comes from a wealthy family that runs several businesses in Indonesia.

Saverin renounced his U.S. citizenship in September 2011, thereby avoiding an estimated US$700 million in capital gains taxes. This generated media attention and controversy. Saverin stated that he renounced his citizenship because of his "interest in working and living in Singapore", and denied that he left the U.S. to avoid paying taxes.

References

Further reading

External links 

Profile at Forbes

1982 births
Living people
Businesspeople from São Paulo
Brazilian people of Romanian-Jewish descent
Brazilian businesspeople
Brazilian investors
Facebook employees
Brazilian emigrants to the United States
Brazilian emigrants to Singapore
Harvard University alumni
Former United States citizens
Brazilian billionaires
Brazilian Jews
Gulliver Preparatory School alumni
American businesspeople